Hansa-Brandenburg W.33 was a German two-seat, single-engined low-wing monoplane floatplane, which had been developed by Hansa und Brandenburgische Flugzeugwerke during World War I as a higher powered enlargement of the similar Hansa-Brandenburg W.29 and despite the increase in size the two types are very difficult to differentiate. Although the W.33 was built in small numbers during the war many license built versions were built after World War I.

History
The Hansa-Brandenburg W.33 aircraft was designed in 1918 by Dr. Hanns Klemm and began entering German service in late 1918. The first examples were powered with a  6 cylinder inline Maybach Mb.IVa, but 8 cylinder inline  Mercedes D.IVa and   6 cylinder inline  Basse und Selve BuS.IVa engines were also fitted.

26 aircraft were built by Hansa-Brandenburg, but only seven were completed before the armistice.

Licence production was carried out in Norway by Marinens Flyvebaatfabrikk (Naval Aircraft Factory) who built 24 for the Navy from 1920 until 1929 as the Maake II (or Make II in some translations), and  Maake III, as well as one Maake III for the Army. These had followed the Maake I, which was a licence-built Hansa-Brandenburg W.29. In addition, six Maake IIs were completed at by Norsk Aeroplanefabrikk (Army Aircraft Factory) when the company initially contracted to build them failed to deliver, although these were later handed over to the Navy, along with four additional newly manufactured Maake IIIs built at Haerens Flyvenmaskinfabrikk/Kjeller Flyfabrikk, as the Army no longer had any need for them. The Maake IIIs had some minor detail differences from the Maake IIs. These were normally armed with a fixed Vickers machine gun and a flexible Lewis gun. Lamblin radiators were used on Norwegian examples in lieu of the  car type radiator mounted ahead of the engine that was otherwise normal for the type. 
When the final examples were retired from the Navy in 1935 two examples were given civil registrations (N-47 and N-48) and briefly used to deliver mail.

In 1921, Finland obtained the manufacturing license for the W.33 and the first Finnish-built example flew on 4 November 1922, as the IVL A.22 Hansa.
These were powered by  inline six-cylinder Fiat A-12bis engines due to shortages of the German engines. This was the first aircraft to be mass produced in Finland and 120 were eventually built between 1922 and 1925, and the Finnish Air Force would operate the aircraft until 1936. Armament was similar to the Norwegian examples, although two Lewis guns were sometimes fitted. Some of the Finnish aircraft also had their floats replaced with skis.

Japan received a single W.33 as war reparations, and from 1922 to 1925, built 310 examples for the Imperial Japanese Navy. 160 of these were built by Nakajima and 150 were built by Aichi, with minor modifications, including the substitution of the German inline engine with a  water-cooled V-8 Mitsubishi Type Hi engine (a licence-built Hispano-Suiza V-8), and other detail changes to meet Japanese requirements. These were not popular in Japanese service due to inadequate directional control and poor downward visibility from the cockpit, but were flown from the battleship Nagato for seaplane trials in 1926. By 1927, they were gradually being replaced, and the last examples were retired from military service in 1928, although some of these would continue in civilian service after having been converted with a cabin to seat 3-5 passengers by the Ando Aeroplane Research Studio and Japan Air Transport Research Association.

Latvia received two IVL A.22s from the Finnish Air Force in December 1926, however both were completely wrecked the following March, prompting a major rebuild, which some sources have counted as two additional aircraft having been built. It took until 1928 before they had been returned to service, and they remained in use until 1933.

Variants
Hansa-Brandenburg W.33C3MG  standard version, armed with two fixed and one flexible machine gun, five built during WW1
Hansa-Brandenburg W.33C2MG HFT  equipped with radio and armed with one fixed gun, and one flexible gun, one built during WW1
Hansa-Brandenburg W.33CK  two fixed machine guns and a flexible Becker  cannon, one built during WW1

Hansa-Brandenburg Make II and III  Norwegian W.33s built under licence, 35 built.

IVL A.22 Hansa  Finnish license manufactured W.33, 120 built with  Fiat A-12bis engines.

Operators

Finnish Air Force (Ilmavoimat)

Kaiserliche Marine (Marinefliegerkorps)

Imperial Japanese Navy Air Service

Latvian Navy / Air Force 

Royal Norwegian Navy Air Service (Marinens flyvevesen)
Norwegian Army Air Service (Hærens flyvåpen)

Survivors
The sole survivor of the type is an IVL A.22 Hansa in the Finnish Aviation Museum in Helsinki.

Specifications (W.33CK)

See also

References

Citations

Bibliography

1910s German military reconnaissance aircraft
W.33
Floatplanes
Single-engined tractor aircraft
Low-wing aircraft
Aircraft first flown in 1918